Buumi (many variations : Buumy, Bumy, Bumi, etc.) was a Serer royal title in the Serer pre-colonial 
Kingdoms of Sine, Saloum and previously Baol.  All these pre-colonial Serer kingdoms are now part of modern-day Senegal. However, present-day Gambia, was called Lower Saloum and a former colony of the Kingdom of Saloum. The Buumi was always a member of the royal family. He was the first in line to inherit the throne of the Maad a Sinig (King of Sine) or Maad Saloum (king of Saloum).  In some cases, a Buumi can act as regent if the king is too young, as was the case with Maad a Sinig Ama Joof Gnilane Faye Joof, whose uncle was appointed regent until Maad Ama Joof became much older. In pre-colonial Sine, the Buumi usually took residence at Somb Rongodior. In many cases, he was elected by the Maad a Sinig as his successor, however, the Great Jaraff and his Noble Council of Electors generally decides which member of the royal family succeeds to the throne.  When Maad a Sinig dies without nominating his Buumi, as was the case with Maad a Sinig Mbackeh Ndeb Njie, the "thilas" (the second in line to the throne) may succeed him as was the case with Maad a Sinig Kumba Ndoffene Fa Ndeb Joof.
 
The Buumi was a very important figure in the Serer kingdoms. They had their own army and also led a contingent force of the country in times of war. At The Battle of Fandane-Thiouthioune (18 July 1867) also known as the Battle of Somb, the Buumi Somb commanded the army of eastern Sine.  In the Kingdom of Saloum, which had a very similar political structure as the Kingdom of Sine, the two most important Buumis were : the Buumi Kaymor (Buumi of Kaymor) and Buumi Mandak (Buumi of Mandak). They both took residence at Kaymor and Mandak (in Saloum), respectively. In Sine, there was also the Buumi Nguess (Buumi of Nguess) and Buumi Ndidor (Buumi of Ndidor).  Although they were all important figures, they should not be confused with the "Buumi" (their heir apparent).

Notes

Bibliography
Diouf, Niokhobaye. Chronique du royaume du Sine. Suivie de notes sur les traditions orales et les sources écrites concernant le royaume du Sine par Charles Becker et Victor Martin. (1972). Bulletin de l'Ifan, Tome 34, Série B, n° 4, (1972).
Sarr, Alioune. Histoire du Sine-Saloum. Introduction, bibliographie et Notes par Charles Becker, BIFAN, Tome 46, Serie B, n° 3–4, 1986–1987
Klein, Martin A. Islam and Imperialism in Senegal Sine-Saloum, 1847–1914. Edinburgh University Press (1968)

Serer royalty
Serer history